Reykjanesviti is Iceland's oldest lighthouse, located at Reykjanestá. It serves as a landfall light for Reykjavík and Keflavík.

History 
The original structure was built in 1878; just eight years later the building was destroyed by an earthquake. In 1929 the current Reykjanesviti lighthouse, a concrete construction yet with traditional looks, was illuminated. Its focal plane measures 73 metres above sea level.

The light characteristic is "Fl (2) W 30 s.", i.e. a group of two flashing lights every 30 seconds. An antenna for the transmission of DGPS-signals in the longwave range is mounted on the rooftop.  There is also a two-story keeper's residence built in the modern area, and the lighthouse has a resident keeper.  The lighthouse is located near an area of thermal activity, and steam from this source is often seen in photographs of the lighthouse.

See also 
 List of lighthouses in Iceland

References

External links

 Heimasíða Siglingastofnunar Íslands –Reykjanesviti 

Lighthouses completed in 1878
Lighthouses completed in 1929
Lighthouses in Iceland
Reykjanes